The 1938–39 Kansas Jayhawks men's basketball team represented the University of Kansas during the 1938–39 college men's basketball season. The Jayhawks were coached by Phog Allen. On January 18, 1939, the Jayhawks notched their 500th program victory by defeating rival Missouri Tigers at Home. Kansas failed to qualify for the 1939 NCAA Tournament, which was the first tournament ever held.

Roster
Robert Allen
Lyman Corlis
Ralph Dugan
Donald Ebling
Howard Engleman
Loren Florell
Richard Harp
Lester Kappelman
John Kline
Ralph Miller
Charles Nees
Max Replogle
Jack Sands

Schedule

References

Kansas Jayhawks men's basketball seasons
Kansas
Kansas
Kansas